Dobbin Bay is an Arctic waterway in Qikiqtaaluk Region, Nunavut, Canada. It is located in Nares Strait by eastern Ellesmere Island, south of the Darling Peninsula.

Exploration

During the British Arctic Expedition of 1875 under George Nares, ancient cairns were found on Washington Irving Island, located in the mouth of the bay.

The area was also explored by Adolphus Washington Greely during his expedition of 1881–1884.

References

Bays of Qikiqtaaluk Region
Ellesmere Island